Christian Jambet (born 23 April 1949, Algiers, French Algeria) is a French philosopher and Islamologist.

Publications

Essais 
1976: Apologie de Platon, Essais de métaphysique, coll. « Théoriciens », Éditions Grasset, 249 p.
 With Guy Lardreau, Ontologie de la révolution :
1976: I. L'ange. Pour une cynégétique du semblant, coll. « Figures », Éditions Grasset.
1978: II. Le Monde. Réponse à la question « Qu'est-ce que les droits de l'homme ? », coll. « Figures », Éditions Grasset, 281 p.
1983:  La Logique des Orientaux. Henry Corbin et la science des formes, coll. « L'Ordre philosophique », Éditions du Seuil, 315 p.
1990: La Grande résurrection d'Alamût. Les formes de la liberté dans le shî'isme ismaélien, Verdier, Lagrasse, 418 p.
2002: L'Acte d'être. La philosophie de la révélation chez Mulla Sadra, coll. « L'espace intérieur », Fayard, 447 p.
2003: Le Caché et l'apparent, coll. « Mythes et religions », L'Herne, 206 p.
2004: with Mohammad Ali Amir-Moezzi : Qu'est-ce que le shî'isme ?, Fayard, 386 p.
2007: with Jean Bollack and Abdelwahab Meddeb : La Conférence de Ratisbonne, enjeux et controverses, Bayard, 115 p.
2008: Mort et résurrection en islam, L'au-delà selon Molla Sadra, coll. « Spiritualités », Albin Michel.
2011: Qu'est-ce que la philosophie islamique, folio essais.
2016: Le gouvernement divin. Islam et conception politique du monde, CNRS éditions,

Commented translations 
1994: Oscar Wilde : Ballade de la geôle de Reading, trad. et postface de CJ, Verdier, 104 p.
1996: Nazîroddîn Tûsî : La Convocation d'Alamût, Somme de philosophie ismaélienne, Verdier, 375 p.
1998: Jalâloddîn Rûmî : Soleil du réel, Poèmes d'amour mystique, Imprimerie nationale, 227 p.
2000: Se rendre immortel, suivi de la traduction de Mollâ Sadrâ Shîrâzî : Traité de la résurrection, Fata Morgana, 186 p.

Editions and important prefaces 
1975: Gilles Susong : La Politique d'Orphée, Essai sur la tradition despotique en Grèce ancienne, Grasset.
1991: Les homélies clémentines, Verdier.
1992: Leili Echghi : Un temps entre les temps, L'imam, le chi'isme, l'Iran, Le Cerf.
 Henry Corbin :
1993: Itinéraire d'un enseignement, Institut français de recherche en Iran.
1994: Trilogie ismaelienne, Verdier.
2001: Suhrawardi d'Alep, Fata Morgana.
2003: Sohrawardi : Le livre de la sagesse orientale, Gallimard
1999: Correspondance Corbin-Ivanow, Peeters.
2000: Isabelle de Gastine, translation of Nezâmi : Les sept portraits, Fayard.
2001: Michel Cazenave : La chute vertigineuse, Arma Artis.
2005: S.J. Badakhchani, edition and translation of Rawda-yi taslim: Paradise of submission, A medieval treatise on Ismaili thought, Tauris.
2005: Forough Farrokhzad: La conquête du jardin, Poèmes, 1951–1965, Lettres persanes.
2007: Farhad Daftary: Légendes des Assassins, Mythes sur les Ismaéliens, Vrin.
2009: Louis Massignon, Écrits mémorables, 178 texts (some unpublished) edited, presented and annotated under the direction of Christian Jambet, by François Angelier, François L'Yvonnet and Souâd Ayada, Robert-Laffont, coll. « Bouquins », 2 volumes.

Participation to collective works 
2009: Philosophies d'ailleurs. Les pensées indiennes, chinoises et tibétaines, under the direction of Roger-Pol Droit, Éditions Hermann.

See also 
 Gauche prolétarienne

External links 
 Christian Jambet Interview on France Culture
 Christian Jambet : Qu’est-ce que la philosophie islamique ?
 Notice on the site of the École pratique des Hautes Études 
 Christian Jambet, l’esprit rebelle on Le Monde (26 May 2016)
 Conference on YouTube (4 August 2014)

20th-century French philosophers
21st-century French philosophers
French Iranologists
French scholars of Islam
Academic staff of the École pratique des hautes études
Officiers of the Ordre des Arts et des Lettres
French Maoists
1949 births
Living people
New Philosophers
People from Algiers